A constitutional referendum was held in the Republic of Upper Volta on 14 June 1970. It followed the 1966 military coup, and would restore multi-party democracy. However, the new constitution made the country a presidential republic, with the President able to dissolve the National Assembly and rule by decree. It also allowed coup leader Sangoulé Lamizana to remain President for a further four years. It was approved by 98.56% of voters with a 77.3% turnout.

Results

References

1970
Upper Voltan constitutional referendum
Constitutional referendum
Upper Voltan constitutional referendum
Constitutional referendums